Jinyu is a Chinese unisex given name. Notable people with the given name include:

 Han JinYu (born 1979), Chinese painter
 Li Jinyu (born 1977), Chinese footballer and coach
 Zhong Jinyu (born 1983), Chinese footballer

Chinese given names
Unisex given names